High-valent iron commonly denotes compounds and intermediates in which iron is found in a formal oxidation state > 3 that show a number of bonds > 6 with a coordination number ≤ 6. The term is rather uncommon for hepta-coordinate compounds of iron. It has to be distinguished from the terms hypervalent and hypercoordinate, as high-valent iron compounds neither necessarily violate the 18-electron rule nor necessarily show coordination numbers > 6. The ferrate(VI) ion [FeO4]2− was the first structure in this class synthesized. The synthetic compounds discussed below contain highly oxidized iron in general, as the concepts are closely related.

Oxoiron compounds
Oxoferryl species are commonly proposed as intermediates in catalytic cycles, especially biological systems in which O2 activation is required. Diatomic oxygen has a high reduction potential (E0 = 1.23 V), but the first step required to harness this potential is a thermodynamically unfavorable one electron reduction E0 = -0.16 V. This reduction occurs in nature by the formation of a superoxide complex in which a reduced metal is oxidized by O2. The product of this reaction is a peroxide radical that is more readily reactive. A widely applicable method for the generation of high-valent oxoferryl species is the oxidation with iodosobenzene:

symbolic oxidation of an iron compound using iodosobenzene; L denotes the supporting ligand

Fe(IV)O

Several syntheses of oxoiron(IV) species have been reported. These compounds model biological complexes such as cytochrome P450, NO synthase, and isopenicillin N synthase. Two such reported compounds are thiolate-ligated oxoiron(IV) and cyclam-acetate oxoiron(IV).
Thiolate-ligated oxoiron(IV) is formed by the oxidation of a precursor, [FeII(TMCS)](PF6) (TMCS = 1-mercaptoethyl-4,8,11-trimethyl-1,4,8,11-tetraza cyclotetradecane), and 3-5 equivalents of H2O2 at -60 ˚C in methanol. The iron(IV) compound is deep blue in color and shows intense absorption features at 460 nm, 570 nm, 850 nm, and 1050 nm. This species FeIV(=O)(TMCS)+ is stable at -60 ˚C, but decomposition is reported as temperature increases. Compound 2 was identified by Mössbauer spectroscopy, high resolution electrospray ionization mass spectrometry (ESI-MS), X-ray absorption spectroscopy, extended X-ray absorption fine structure (EXAFS), ultraviolet–visible spectroscopy (UV-vis), Fourier-transform infrared spectroscopy (FT-IR), and results were compared to density functional theory (DFT) calculations.

Tetramethylcyclam oxoiron(IV) is formed by the reaction of FeII(TMC)(OTf)2, TMC = 1,4,8,11-tetramethyl-1,4,8,11-tetraazacyclotetradecane; OTf = CF3SO3, with iodosylbenzene (PhIO) in CH3CN at -40 ˚C. A second method for formation of cyclam oxoiron(IV) is reported as the reaction of FeII(TMC)(OTf)2 with 3 equivalents of H2O2 for 3 hours. This species is pale green in color and has an absorption maximum at 820 nm. It is reported to be stable for at least 1 month at -40 ˚C. It has been characterized by Mössbauer spectroscopy, ESI-MS, EXAFS, UV-vis, Raman spectroscopy, and FT-IR.

High-valent iron bispidine complexes can oxidize cyclohexane to cyclohexanol and cyclohexanone in 35% yield with an alcohol to ketone ratio up to 4.

Fe(V)O
FeVTAML(=O), TAML = tetra-amido macrocyclic ligand, is formed by the reaction of [FeIII(TAML)(H2O)](PPh4) with 2-5 equivalents of meta-chloroperbenzoic acid at -60 ˚C in n-butyronitrile. This deep green compound (two λmax at 445 and 630 nm respectively) is stable at 77 K.  The stabilization of Fe(V) is attributed to the strong π–donor capacity of deprotonated amide nitrogens.

Fe(VI)O

Ferrate(VI) is an inorganic anion of chemical formula [FeO4]2−. It is photosensitive and contributes a pale violet colour to its compounds and solutions. It is one of the strongest water-stable oxidising species known. Although it is classified as a weak base, concentrated solutions of ferrate(VI) are only stable at high pH.

Electronic structure
The electronic structure of porphyrin oxoiron compounds has been reviewed.

Nitridoiron and imidoiron compounds

Nitridoiron and imidoiron compounds are closely related to iron-dinitrogen chemistry. The biological significance of nitridoiron(V) porphyrins has been reviewed. A widely applicable method to generate high-valent nitridoiron species is the thermal or photochemical oxidative elimination of molecular nitrogen from an azide complex.

symbolic oxidative elimination of nitrogen yields a nitridoiron complex; L denotes the supporting ligand.

Fe(IV)N
Several structurally characterized nitridoiron(IV) compounds exist.

Fe(V)N
The first nitridoiron(V) compound was synthesised and characterized by Wagner and Nakamoto (1988, 1989) using photolysis and Raman spectroscopy at low temperatures.

Fe(VI)N
A second FeVI species apart from the ferrate(VI) ion, [(Me3cy-ac)FeN](PF6)2, has been reported. This species, is formed by oxidation followed by photolysis to yield the Fe(VI) species. Characterization of the Fe(VI) complex was done by Mossbauer, EXAFS, IR, and DFT calculations. Unlike the ferrate(VI) ion, compound 5 is diamagnetic.

μ-Nitrido compounds and oxidation catalysis
Bridged μ-nitrido di-iron phthalocyanine compounds such as iron(II) phthalocyanine catalyze the oxidation of methane to methanol, formaldehyde, and formic acid using hydrogen peroxide as sacrificial oxidant.

Electronic structure
Nitridoiron(IV) and nitridoiron(V) species were first explored theoretically in 2002.

See also
Jacobsen's catalyst (high-valent manganese)
Iron(IV) oxytetrafluoroborate

References

Further reading
Solomon et al.; Angewandte Chemie International Edition Volume 47, Issue 47, pages 9071–9074, November 10, 2008; 

Iron
Ferrates
Iron_complexes
Oxidizing agents
Inorganic chemistry
Cluster chemistry
Coordination complexes
Iron, high-valent